Brest Métropole is the métropole, an intercommunal structure, centred on the city of Brest. It is located in the Finistère department, in the Brittany region, western France. It was created in January 2015, replacing the previous Communauté urbaine de Brest. Its population was 215,367 in 2019, of which 142,555 in Brest proper.

History 
The Urban Community was founded in 1973. On January 1, 2015, the Métropole replaced the Urban Community in accordance with a law of January 2014.

Member communes
The Brest Métropole consists of the following 8 communes:
 Bohars
 Brest
 Gouesnou
 Guilers
 Guipavas
 Plougastel-Daoulas
 Plouzané
 Le Relecq-Kerhuon

Administration 
The Metropolitan Council consists of 70 members, one of them being the president, currently François Cuillandre, the mayor of Brest.

References

External links
 Brest Métropole website

Metropolis in France
Intercommunalities of Finistère
Brest, France